Sara Errani and Roberta Vinci were the defending champions, but chose not to participate this year.
Tímea Babos and Kimiko Date-Krumm won the title, defeating Eva Birnerová and Tamarine Tanasugarn in the final 6–1, 6–4.

Seeds

Draw

Draw

References
 Main Draw

Monterrey Open - Doubles
Monterrey Open